Allied health professions  are health care professions distinct from optometry, dentistry, nursing, medicine, and pharmacy. They provide a range of diagnostic, technical, therapeutic, and support services in connection with health care.

Definition 

In 2012, the International Chief Health Professions Officers defined the allied health professions:

Professions 

Depending on the country and local health care system, a limited subset of the following professions (professional areas) may be represented, and may be regulated:

The precise titles, roles and requisites of allied health professionals may vary considerably from country to country. A generic definition for the United States is in the Public Health Service Act.

Excluded professions 

The Association of Schools of Allied Health Professions uses wording from the Public Health Service Act to list those who are and are not allied health professionals in the United States. Those professionals who are excluded are those who possess degrees, or an equivalent degree, in the following:

Training and education

Some allied health professions are more specialized, and so must adhere to national training and education standards and their professional scope of practice. Often they must prove their skills through degrees, diplomas, certified credentials, and continuing education. Other allied health professions require no special training or credentials and are trained for their work by their employer through on-the-job training (which would then exclude them from consideration as an allied health profession in a country like Australia). Many allied health jobs are considered career ladder jobs because of the opportunities for advancement within specific fields.

Allied health professions can include the use of many skills. Depending on the profession, these may include basic life support; medical terminology, acronyms and spelling; basics of medical law and ethics; understanding of human relations; interpersonal communication skills; counseling skills; computer literacy; ability to document healthcare information; interviewing skills; and proficiency in word processing; database management and electronic dictation.

History

The explosion of scientific knowledge that followed World War II brought increasingly sophisticated and complex medical diagnostic and treatment procedures. Increasing public demand for medical services combined with higher health care costs provoked a trend toward expansion of service delivery from treating patients in hospitals to widespread provision of care in physician's private and group practices, ambulatory medical and emergency clinics, and mobile clinics and community-based care. In the developing world, international development assistance led to numerous initiatives for strengthening health workforce capacity to deliver essential health care services. What followed has been an increase in the need for skilled health care delivery personnel worldwide.

Changes in the health industry and emphasis on cost-efficient solutions to health care delivery will continue to encourage expansion of the allied health workforce. The World Health Organization estimates there is currently a worldwide shortage of about 2 million allied health professionals (considering all health workers aside from medical and nursing personnel) needed in order to meet global health goals.

In recognition of the growth of the number and diversity of allied health professionals in recent years, the 2008 version of the International Standard Classification of Occupations increased the number of groups dedicated to allied health professions. Depending on the presumed skill level, they may either be identified as "health professionals" or "health associate professionals". For example, new categories have been created for delineating "paramedical practitioners"—grouping professions such as clinical officers, clinical associates, physician assistants, Feldshers, and assistant medical officers—as well as for community health workers; dietitians and nutritionists; audiologists and speech therapists; and others.

Employment projections

Projections in the United States and many other countries have shown an expected long-term shortage of qualified workers to fill many allied health positions. This is primarily due to expansion of the health industry due to demographic changes (a growing and aging population), large numbers of health workers nearing retirement, the industry's need to be cost efficient, and a lack of sufficient investment in training programs to keep pace with these trends.

Studies have also pointed to the need for increased diversity in the allied health workforce to realize a culturally competent health system in the United States and elsewhere.

Workforce and health care experts anticipate that health services will increasingly be delivered via ambulatory and nursing care settings rather than in hospitals. According to the North American Industry Classification System (NAICS), the health care industry consists of four main sub-sectors, divided by the types of services provided at each facility:
 Hospitals: primarily provides inpatient health services and may provide some outpatient services as a secondary activity. 
 Ambulatory health care settings: primarily provides outpatient services at facilities such as doctors' offices, outpatient clinics and clinical laboratories. 
 Nursing and residential care facilities: provides residential care, such as community care for the elderly or mental health and substance abuse facilities.
 Social Assistance: provides services for the elderly and/or disabled, services for the homeless and poor, vocational rehabilitation, or child day care services.

In the US, a larger proportion of the allied health care workforce is already employed in ambulatory settings. In California, nearly half (49.4 percent) of the allied health workforce is employed in ambulatory health care settings, compared with 28.7 percent and 21.9 percent employed in hospital and nursing care, respectively. One source reported allied health professionals making up 60 percent of the total US health workforce.

In the United Kingdom there are 12 distinct professions who are considered allied health professionals; in combination they account for about 6% of the NHS workforce. In 2013 the annual expenditure on services provided by allied health professionals amounted to around £2 billion, although there is a lack of evidence around the extent to which these services improve the quality of care.

Advancements in medical technology also allow for more services that formerly required expensive hospital stays to be delivered via ambulatory care. For example, in California, research has predicted the total consumption of hospital days per person will decline from 4 days in 2010 to 3.2 days in 2020 to 2.5 days in 2030. In contrast, the number of ambulatory visits per person will increase from 3.2 visits per person in 2010 to 3.6 visits per person in 2020 to 4.2 visits in 2030.

In developing countries, many national human resources for health strategic plans and international development initiatives are focusing on scaling up training of allied health professions, such as HIV/AIDS counsellors, clinical officers and community health workers, in providing essential preventive and treatment services in ambulatory and community-based care settings.

With this growing demand for ambulatory health care, researchers expect to witness a heavier demand for professions that are employed within the ambulatory sector and other non-hospital settings—in other words, allied health.

See also

 Health care providers
 Human resources for health
 Paramedicine
 Unlicensed assistive personnel

References

External links

AMA Allied health professionals
Association of Schools of Allied Health Professions (ASAHP)
Allied Health Professionals on NHS Careers (UK)